This was the first edition of the tournament.

Donna Vekić won her first title since 2017, defeating Clara Tauson in the final, 7–6(7–3), 6–2. Vekić didn't drop a set to win the tournament.

Seeds

Draw

Finals

Top half

Bottom half

Qualifying

Seeds

Qualifiers

Lucky losers

Qualifying draw

First qualifier

Second qualifier

Third qualifier

Fourth qualifier

Fifth qualifier

Sixth qualifier

References

External links
Main draw
Qualifying draw

Courmayeur Ladies Open - Singles
Sport in Courmayeur